Sant'Egidio may refer to:

 St. Giles (640?–720?)
 Community of Sant'Egidio, an international Christian lay community
 Sant'Egidio, Rome (Trastevere), the church from which the community of Sant'Egidio takes its name
 Sant'Egidio (Mantua), a church in Mantua, Italy

Placenames
 Sant'Egidio alla Vibrata, a comune in the province of Teramo, Abruzzo
 Sant'Egidio del Monte Albino, a comune in the province of Salerno, Campania
 Sant'Egidio, a hamlet of the comune of Ferrara